This is a list of the first women lawyer(s) and judge(s) in Arkansas. It includes the year in which the women were admitted to practice law (in parentheses). Also included are women who achieved other distinctions such becoming the first in their state to graduate from law school or become a political figure.

Firsts in Arkansas' history

Degree 
 First female (master's degree in judicial studies): Cindy Thyer in 2019

Lawyers 
First female: Sarah Shields (1918) 
 First African American female: Sharon E. Bernard Miller (1970) 
 First Vietnamese American (female): Niki T. Cung (1996)

Law Clerk 
 First (African American) female to clerk for the Arkansas Supreme Court: Joyce Williams Warren (1976) in 1977

State judges 
 First female: Elsijane Trimble Roy (1939) 
 First female (Sixth Judicial District): Elsijane Trimble Roy (1939) in 1966
 First female (Arkansas Supreme Court): Elsijane Trimble Roy (1939) from 1975-1977 
 First African American female: Joyce Williams Warren (1976) in 1988 
 First African American female (First Circuit): Kathleen Bell in 1988
 First African American female (Arkansas Supreme Court):Andree Layton Roaf (1979) circa 1995-1996  
First female (Chief Justice; Arkansas Supreme Court): Betty Dickey (1985) in 2004 
First female (Third Judicial Circuit): Michelle Huff in 2019

Federal judges 

 First female (U.S. District Court for the Western District of Arkansas): Elsijane Trimble Roy (1939) in 1977

Attorney General of Arkansas 
First female: Mary Stallcup in 1991 
First female (elected): Leslie Rutledge in 2015

Prosecuting Attorney 

First female elected: Betty Dickey in 1995

Arkansas Bar Association 

 First female (president): Carolyn Witherspoon in 1995

Firsts in local history 

 Betty Dickey: First female to be elected as a Prosecuting Attorney for the Eleventh Judicial District [Arkansas, Jefferson and Lincoln Counties, Arkansas; 1995]
 Carol Crews: First female Prosecuting Attorney for the Twentieth Judicial District, Arkansas [Faulkner, Searcy and Van Buren Counties, Arkansas; 2018]
 Michelle Huff: First female appointed as a Judge of the Third Judicial Circuit in Arkansas (2019) [Jackson, Lawrence, Randolph and Sharp Counties, Arkansas]
 Stephanie Black: First female Prosecuting Attorney for the Eighth Judicial District, Arkansas [Lafayette and Miller Counties, Arkansas; 2015]
 Georgia Kimbro Elrod: First female lawyer in Benton County, Arkansas (1974)
 Ruth LaVerne Grayson: First female county judge in Boone County, Arkansas
 Kim Bridgeforth: First female judge in Jefferson County, Arkansas
 Pauline LaFon Gore (1936): First female lawyer in Texarkana, Arkansas [Miller County, Arkansas]
 Cathy Hardin Harrison: First elected female county judge in Miller County, Arkansas (2019)
 Maud Crawford (1927): First female lawyer in Camden, Arkansas [Ouachita County, Arkansas]
 Joyce Williams Warren (1976): First African American female judge in Pulaski County, Arkansas (1988)
 Barbara Webb: First female circuit judge in Saline County, Arkansas (2017)
 Stacy Leeds: First Native American (Cherokee) female to become the Dean of the University of Arkansas Law School [Washington County, Arkansas]
 Suzanne Lighton: First female lawyer in Washington County, Arkansas

See also 

 List of first women lawyers and judges in the United States
 Timeline of women lawyers in the United States
 Women in law

Other topics of interest 

 List of first minority male lawyers and judges in the United States
 List of first minority male lawyers and judges in Arkansas

References

Lawyers, Arkansas, first
Arkansas, first
Women, Arkansas, first
Women, Arkansas, first
Women in Arkansas
Lawyers and judges
Arkansas lawyers